The Centralian blind snake (Anilios centralis) is a species of snake in the Typhlopidae family.

References

Anilios
Reptiles described in 1984
Snakes of Australia